Mohammed Ali Hammadi, also known as Mohammed Ali Hamadi  (born 13 June 1964, in Lebanon) is one of the list of FBI's Most Wanted Terrorists most notable for being the lead hijacker in the TWA Flight 847 hijacking. A Lebanese citizen and alleged member of Hezbollah, he was convicted in a West German court of law of air piracy, murder, and possession of explosives for his part in the 14 June 1985 hijacking of TWA Flight 847.

Under indictment by US law enforcement for crimes related to the same hijacking, during which one passenger, U.S. Navy Seabee diver Robert Stethem, was extensively tortured prior to being murdered, Hammadi was sentenced to life imprisonment by the West German court. He was imprisoned in 1987 in West Germany for 19 years, but was paroled in 2005. He is considered a fugitive by the United States Department of Justice, which listed him as one of the FBI's Most Wanted Terrorists in 2006. He is believed to reside in Lebanon.

There has been speculation that his parole was granted as part of a covert prisoner swap, in exchange for the release of Susanne Osthoff. Taken hostage in Iraq a month prior, Osthoff was released the week of Hammadi's parole.

Imprisoned in West Germany
Two years after the TWA Flight 847 attack, Hammadi was arrested in Frankfurt, West Germany, in 1987 while attempting to smuggle liquid explosives. The United States immediately requested his extradition but Hezbullah immediately abducted two West Germans in Beirut, and threatened to kill them if Hamadei were extradited. Then it was decided to try Hamadei in West Germany. In addition to the charges in West Germany of illegal importation of explosives, he was charged with the 1985 hijacking and hostage taking; tried and convicted of Stethem's 1985 murder, he was sentenced to life in prison.

The first opportunity for parole to be granted on a life sentence in Germany is ordinarily after 15 years. However, Hammadi's life sentence included a provision that due to an exceptional grave degree of guilt the first parole review was to be later. The Landgericht (regional court) Kleve decided on 30 November 2005, to grant Hammadi's application for parole, after his having served 19 years of his term. The US government has sought his extradition from Lebanon.

Fugitive in Lebanon
His indicted accomplices in the TWA Flight 847 attack, Hassan Izz-Al-Din and Ali Atwa continue to elude arrest and currently remain at large, having been placed among the original 22 fugitives on the FBI's Most Wanted Terrorists list on 10 October 2001, in the immediate aftermath of 9/11. Another accomplice, Imad Mughniyeh, was killed on 12 February 2008 in a car-bombing attack in Damascus, Syria. Those responsible for this attack remain unknown as of 13 February 2008.

On 14 February 2006, the United States federal government, through the ambassador to Lebanon, had formally asked the Lebanese government to extradite Mohammed Ali Hammadi for the murder of Robert Stethem during the 1985 hijacking. On 24 February 2006, he joined his accomplices on the FBI's Most Wanted Terrorists list, under the name Mohammed Ali Hamadei.

Several news outlets reported the announcement by Hezbollah of the death of Imad Mugniyah by explosion in Syria on 13 February 2008.  The remaining three fugitives from TWA Flight 847 remain on the list, and at large.

On 12 September 2006, a "Bush administration official" indicated that Hammadi had rejoined Hezbollah upon his release from German prison.

On 12 February 2007, the FBI announced a new $5 million reward for information leading to the recapture of Hammadi.

Reported death
According to Deutsche Presse-Agentur, unconfirmed Pakistani intelligence sources reported that Hammadi was killed in a CIA drone strike inside Pakistan in June 2010. However, Hammadi's death was never confirmed, and he remains on the FBI's Most Wanted Terrorists list and the State Department's Rewards for Justice list.

References

1964 births
Hezbollah hijackers
People paroled from life sentence
Lebanese Islamists
Lebanese prisoners sentenced to life imprisonment
Prisoners sentenced to life imprisonment by Germany
FBI Most Wanted Terrorists
Possibly living people